The 2021 Conference USA men's soccer tournament, was the 26th edition of the tournament. Conference USA did not conduct a men's soccer tournament after the 2020 season due to the COVID-19 pandemic.  The tournament determined Conference USA's automatic berth into the 2021 NCAA Division I men's soccer tournament. The tournament began November 10 and concluded on November 14. The tournament was hosted by University of Charlotte, and all matches were played at the Transamerica Field in Charlotte, North Carolina. This would mark the final C-USA Tournament played as the conference stopped sponsoring men's soccer after the 2021 season when it lost all nine of its members due to conference realignment.

Seeds 
The top six teams in C-USA by conference records qualified for the tournament.

Bracket

Results

First round

Semifinals

Final

Statistics

Goalscorers

Awards

All Tournament XI 

Source:

* Offensive MVP
^ Defensive MVP

References

External links 
 Men's Soccer Championship - Conference USA

Conference USA Men's Soccer Tournament
Conference USA